Gamsjager–Wysong Farm, also known as the Old Gamsjager Place, is a historic farmhouse located at St. Clara, Doddridge County, West Virginia. It was built in 1906, and is a two-story, rectangular German-style farmhouse with a two-story rear wing.  It has a steeply pitched roof and sits on a sandstone foundation.  Also on the property is a cellar house and 19th-century German bank barn.

It was listed on the National Register of Historic Places in 1986.

References

Farms on the National Register of Historic Places in West Virginia
Houses on the National Register of Historic Places in West Virginia
Houses completed in 1906
Houses in Doddridge County, West Virginia
National Register of Historic Places in Doddridge County, West Virginia
German-American culture in West Virginia
1906 establishments in West Virginia